Jessimae Peluso (born September 16, 1982) is an American stand-up comedian and television personality. She is best known for being a cast member in the first two seasons of MTV's Girl Code.

Biography
Jessimae Peluso was born in Syracuse, New York. She is of Italian descent. She went to Henninger High School, and graduated with the Class of 2000. In 2001, she first started doing stand-up comedy at the ImprovBoston in Cambridge, Massachusetts. She eventually relocated to Brooklyn, so she could perform at notable venues, such as Broadway Comedy Club.

In 2013, Peluso made her television debut when she became one of the cast members in MTV's Girl Code. She appeared in the first two seasons of the show, but left the show before the premiere of the third season.

Although she departed from Girl Code, Peluso continued to spread her humor using social media, such as Twitter and Instagram. Using her social media, she created a running gag about her having a "crush" on John Stamos. Stamos had acknowledged Peluso's humor and praised her for it.

Even after leaving Girl Code, Peluso kept a close relationship with former cast member, Carly Aquilino. They also have been touring different comedy clubs and doing stand-up shows together.

In 2021, she hosted the Netflix original series Tattoo Redo.

References

External links 

 

1982 births
American people of Italian descent
American stand-up comedians
American women comedians
American television actresses
American women writers
Comedians from New York (state)
Living people
American sketch comedians
21st-century American comedians
21st-century American actresses